FOND OF GmbH, marketed as FOND OF, is a German manufacturer of sustainable, ergonomic backpacks. The startup company was founded by Sven-Oliver Pink, Florian Michajlezko, Oliver Steinki and Juliaan Cazin in 2010 and is based in Cologne.

History
FOND OF, initially founded as ergobag GmbH, launched its first product in 2010: an ergonomic, sustainable backpack for primary school children called ergobag. In the past years, six additional brands were added to their product portfolio leading to a change in company name to Fond of Bags. Today, Fond of Bags has 184 employees and distributes its products in 20 countries worldwide. A further expansion to China and the United States is planned.

Products
Fond of Bags' portfolio contains seven brands:

 Affenzahn
 Ergobag
 Satch
 AEVOR
 pinqponq
 SALZEN
 Offermann

All of these individual adaptable products are produced substantially, using Polyethylene terephthalate, i.e. Polyester made of recycled PET bottles.

Awards
 2011 Red Dot Design Award
 2012 Germany Land of Ideas; enable2start Business Plan Competition Winner
 2013 Red Dot Design Award
 2015 German Design Award for brand satch; Beste neue Marke for ergobag
 2016 German Sustainability Award
 2016 German CSR Award 
 2017 German Entrepreneur Award

Controversies 
In August 2021 the German Federal Cartel Office (Bundeskartellamt) imposed a fine of 2 million euros on Fond Of GmbH for illegal practices of vertical price fixing. The company was accused to have "restricted the pricing of school bags and school backpacks sold by retailers cooperating with the company" according to the authority.

References

External links
Fond of Bags website

Luggage manufacturers
Manufacturing companies of Germany
Sustainable products
Manufacturing companies established in 2010
German companies established in 2010